Miloslav Hořava is a Czech professional ice hockey winger who currently plays for Genève-Servette HC in the Swiss National League A.

Miloslav comes from a talented ice hockey family. He's the oldest son of Miloslav Hořava and an older brother to Petr Hořava (ice hockey).

References

External links
 

1982 births
Living people
Metallurg Novokuznetsk players
Czech ice hockey right wingers
Sportspeople from Kladno
Czech expatriate ice hockey players in Sweden
Czech expatriate ice hockey players in Russia
Czech expatriate ice hockey players in Germany
Czech expatriate ice hockey players in Switzerland